Bundeh (also Romanized as Būndeh; also known as Būndeh-e Bālā) is a village in Ahlamerestaq-e Shomali Rural District, in the Central District of Mahmudabad County, Mazandaran Province, Iran. At the 2006 census, its population was 544, in 133 families.

References 

Populated places in Mahmudabad County